Indonesia participated in the 1951 Asian Games held in the city of New Delhi, India from 4 to 11 March 1951.

Medal summary

Medal table

Medalists

References

Nations at the 1951 Asian Games
1951
Asian Games